Sévigny may refer to:

Places
 Sévigny, Orne, a French commune in Lower Normandy
 Sévigny-la-Forêt
 Sévigny-Waleppe

People with the surname
 Albert Sévigny, Canadian politician
 Bernard Sévigny, Canadian politician
 Chloë Sevigny, American actress
 Pierre Sévigny (politician), Canadian politician
 Pierre Sévigny (ice hockey), hockey player
 Richard Sevigny, hockey player

See also
 Gabriel Beauchesne-Sévigny, Canadian athlete
 Geneviève Beauchesne-Sévigny, Canadian athlete
 Savigny (disambiguation)
 Thérèse Paquet-Sévigny, Canadian diplomat